William Francis Crellin (born 30 June 2000) is an English professional footballer who plays as a goalkeeper for Everton.

Club career
Born in Blackpool, Crellin moved on loan from Fleetwood Town to FC United of Manchester in August 2018, but was recalled early in September 2018.

In July 2019 he was the subject of a failed transfer bid from Premier League club Everton. He moved on loan to Chorley in August 2019.

He signed on loan for Bolton Wanderers in August 2020. His debut came on 5 September in Bolton's first match of the season, a 1–2 home defeat against Bradford in the first round of the EFL Cup. On 28 September Crellin was defended by Bolton head coach Ian Evatt after being criticised for perceived errors in games. A month later however, Evatt criticised Crellin, stating that he needed to "man up" and that Bolton could not afford for their goalkeeper to keep making so many mistakes, after Crellin was at fault for two of Barrow's goals in a 3–3 draw and four days later scored an own goal in a 1–1 draw against Cambridge United. In the next match Crellin saved a penalty to help Bolton beat Bradford City 1–0 and was voted Man of the Match by the Bolton fans. Evatt praised Crellin for responding to the criticism by putting on the Man of the Match display. Crellin continued to make mistakes however and on 13 November he was dropped to the bench for Bolton's derby match against Salford City. He then spent the rest of the season as a back up goalkeeper, first to Matt Gilks, and then to both Gilks and January signing Lukas Jensen.

On 31 January 2022, Crellin joined Everton for an undisclosed fee on a two-and-a-half year deal, linking up with their under-23 squad.

International career
Crellin has represented England at under-17 to under-20 youth levels. In October 2017, Crellin was included in the squad for the 2017 FIFA U-17 World Cup. His only appearance in the tournament was a group stage match against Iraq.

On 14 October 2019, Crellin made his England U20 debut against Czech Republic at Peterborough United.

Career statistics

Honours
England U17
FIFA U-17 World Cup: 2017

References

2000 births
Living people
English footballers
England youth international footballers
Association football goalkeepers
Fleetwood Town F.C. players
F.C. United of Manchester players
Chorley F.C. players
Bolton Wanderers F.C. players
Everton F.C. players
English Football League players
National League (English football) players